Mary Scott may refer to:

Mary Scott, 3rd Countess of Buccleuch (1647–1661), Scottish peeress
Mary Montagu Douglas Scott, Duchess of Buccleuch (1900–1993)
Mary Scott (poet) (1751/2–1793), English poet
Mary Scott (artist) (born 1948), Canadian artist
Mary Augusta Scott (1851–1918), American scholar
Mary Scott (novelist) (1888–1979), New Zealand novelist, teacher and librarian
Mary Scott (missionary) (1887–?), Scottish missionary and educator
Mary Elizabeth MacCallum Scott, Canadian physician and Christian medical missionary